Lee Seon-mi (born 1 August 2000) is a South Korean weightlifter. She represented South Korea at the 2020 Summer Olympics in Tokyo, Japan. She finished in 4th place in the women's +87 kg event.

Career 

At the 2018 Junior World Weightlifting Championships held in Tashkent, Uzbekistan, she won the gold medal in the women's 90kg event. In 2019, at the Junior World Weightlifting Championships held in Suva, Fiji, she won the gold medal in the women's +87kg event.

In April 2021, she competed at the 2020 Asian Weightlifting Championships held in Tashkent, Uzbekistan.

Major results

References

External links 
 

Living people
2000 births
South Korean female weightlifters
Weightlifters at the 2020 Summer Olympics
Olympic weightlifters of South Korea
Sportspeople from North Gyeongsang Province
21st-century South Korean women